Oskar Brázda  (30 September 1887 in Rosice – 19 December 1977 in Líčkov) was a Czech painter and artist.

Biography
Brázda attended the Academy of Fine Arts in Vienna and then, through the imperial scholarship, he studied in Italy. In 1915, in Rome, he married Swedish author Amelie Posse. During World War I, he became familiar with Edvard Beneš and actively participated in the first Czechoslovak resistance. The two were even in the years 1915–1916 interned in Alghero, a town on the island of Sardinia. In 1925, the changing political situation saw him leave Italy and return to his homeland. He lived in Líčkov Castle. He died in 1977. In 1989, his second wife Marie opened the Oskar Brázda Gallery in the castle where visitors can see a number of his works and personal belongings.

See also
List of Czech painters

References

1887 births
1977 deaths
People from Pardubice
Academy of Fine Arts Vienna alumni
20th-century Czech painters
Czech male painters
20th-century Czech male artists